Namangan is a city in eastern Uzbekistan. It is the administrative, economic, and cultural center of Namangan Region. Administratively, it is a district-level city. Namangan is located in the northern edge of the Fergana Valley, less than 30 km from the Kyrgyzstan border. The city is served by Namangan Airport.

Namangan has been an important craft and trade center in the Fergana Valley since the 17th century. Many factories were built in the city during Soviet times. During World War II, industrial production in Namangan increased fivefold compared with that of 1926–1927. Currently, Namangan is mainly a center for light industry, especially in food. The officially registered population of the city was 475,700 in 2014. Uzbeks are the largest ethnic group.

History 
The city takes its name from the local salt mines (in Persian نمک‌کان (namak kan) — "a salt mine"). Babur mentioned the village of Namangan in his memoirs Baburnama. In his book A brief History of the Khanate of Kokand (Kazan, 1886), the Russian ethnographer Vladimir Petrovich Nalivkin wrote that Namangan is mentioned in legal documents dating back to 1643.

The city of Namangan dates back to the 17th cent. A local salt miner's settlement (naman kann) appeared in the north of the Ferghana valley. The inhabitants of Aksikent (Ahsykenta) migrated here in the 17th century after the destructive earthquakes. Aksikent is the old city that was once the center of the valley of Fergana. The city was the province's administrative centre in the middle of the 18th century (viloyat). 

Namangan, like many other cities in the Fergana valley, was originally populated by Sogdian people, although it later became a Persian speaking city; the local variety of Persian became known as the Tajik language. An influx of Turkic-speaking people into the region, starting in late medieval times, led to turkification. While Namangan still had a Tajik majority until the middle of the 19th century, identification of its residents with Turkic rather than Iranian cultures has increased. By the late 20th century, most residents of Namangan speak Uzbek, albeit with a significant Tajik-speaking minority.

Politically, Namangan became a part of the Uyghur Empire of the Karakhanid State and was known to have been a settlement in the 15th century. The residents of the ancient city of Akhsikat, which was severely damaged by an earthquake, moved to the then-village of Namangan in 1610. Namangan became a city afterward. On the eve of the Russian invasion in 1867, the town had been a part of the Khanate of Kokand since the middle of the 18th century.

Namangan was hit by a destructive earthquake in 1926 which killed 34 people, injured 72, and destroyed 4,850 houses.

Since Uzbekistan's independence in 1991, Namangan has gained a reputation for Islamic revivalism, with many mosques and schools funded by organizations from Middle Eastern countries, including the extremist Wahhabi sect from Saudi Arabia that produced jihadist terrorists like Juma Namangani who fought and died in support of the Afghan Taliban and the Al Qaeda. This has also translated into political opposition against the secular government of Uzbekistan. Some women have discarded traditional colorful scarves for large white veils or even the black paranja.

Geography 
The Qoradaryo and Naryn Rivers join to form the Syr Darya just outside the southern edge of the city.

Climate 
Namangan has a cold semi-arid climate (Köppen climate classification: BSk) with cold winters and hot summers.

Main sites

Babur Park 

Located in the centre of the city, Babur Park was created in the late 19th century as the private garden of Namangan's Russian governor, but it is now open to the public. The park is named after Emperor Babur, who was born in the Fergana Valley, and it is known for its many old chinor trees.

Mullah Kyrgyz Madrasa 

The Mullah Kyrgyz Madrassa, built 1910, is named after a local architect, Usto Kyrgyz. Founded by a wealthy cotton magnate from Namangan, it was closed by the Soviets and spent much of the 20th century as a literary museum. The madrassa was restored by local residents following independence and it is listed as an historic monument.

The madrassa's minarets and portal have been completely restored, and the white, blue, yellow, and green mosaic tiles are particularly beautiful. There is carved woodwork on both the ceilings and the columns, including some finely carved calligraphy. Inside is a small courtyard surrounded by 35 rooms, which would have housed nearly 150 students.

Khodjamni Kabri Mausoleum and Khodja Amin Mosque 
The Khodjamni Kabri Mausoleum and neighbouring Khodja Amin Mosque both date from the 1720s and are the work of local architect Usto Muhammad Ibrahim. They have both recently been renovated. Opened on all four sides, the portal-domed mosque hosts intricate terracotta tilework which was produced using a method which was commonplace in the 12th century but had disappeared in the Fergana Valley. The buildings are open for prayer, but only men may enter.

Ota Valikhon Tur Mosque 
Built in 1915, the Ota Valikhon Tur Mosque is located 1 km east of Namangan's bazaar. Arabic calligraphy adorns the brickwork on the exterior, with gorgeous star-shaped carvings. The large domes are decorated with blue mosaic stripes. This mosque was linked with the controversial Wahhabi sect during the 1990s and received funding from Saudi Arabia before it was closed by the Uzbek government. It is now a gallery of the Namangan Artists’ Union, displaying the work of local artists.

Demographics 
With a population of 644,800 (2021), Namangan is Uzbekistan's second-largest city by population. Between 2016 and 2017, the population rose by almost 100,000, partly due to a change of boundaries between the city and the neighbouring districts. Uzbeks and Tajiks are the largest ethnic groups.

Economy 
Namangan has been an important craft and trade center in the Fergana Valley since the 17th century. After annexation by the Russians in 1867, cotton production and food processing became the dominant economic activity, as it did in many other places in the country. Many factories were built in the city during Soviet times. During World War II, industrial production in Namangan increased fivefold compared with that of 1926–1927. After the war both light and heavy industries increased significantly.

Currently Namangan is mainly a center for light industry, especially in food. There are 36 joint companies and over 400 small and medium enterprises in the city.

Education 
Currently there are 5 public and 2 private higher education institutions in Namangan city — the public ones are: Namangan State University, Namangan Institute of Engineering and Construction, Namangan Institute of Engineering and Technology, Namangan State Pedagogical Institute, Namangan State Institute of Foreign Languages, and private ones are: Turan International University, Namangan branch of The Kimyo International University in Tashkent. In 2023 some more institutions are going to be estbalished, such as Namangan textile industry institute, Impuls Medical Institute, University of Business and Science.

Transportation 
Namangan is served by Namangan Airport which is located 12 km from the city center. The city has its own railway station which was built in 1912. It currently only allows for passengers two days a week. Taxi and bus services are run by private organisations but all use a similar route and payment model.

Notable people 
Mashrab (1640–1711) — an influential Sufi poet. Boborahim Mashrab was born in 1657. He went to Qashqar and increased his knowledge under supervision of Ofoq Hoja. From 1673 up to the end of his life he lived as a travelling mystic. In 1711 he was murdered by hokim of Balh Mahmud Taragay. In M. Namangoniy's “ Tazkiratul-avliyo”, I. Bogistoniy's “Tazkirai-qalandaron”, M. Samarqandiy's “Muzakkiri – ashob”, Hakimhon's “Muhtabat – tavorih”, M. Olim's “Ansobus-Salotin” we may find some information about his life and works. The Russian scientists N.I. Veselovskiy, N.S. Likoshin, V.L. Vyatkin expressed important ideas about Mashrab's creative works in 19th and 20th centuries. Also some specialists in Uzbek literature such as I. Sulton, V. Zohidov, I. Muminov, G. Gulom, A.Hayitmetov, A. Abdugafurov, E. Shodiyev, V. Abdullayev expressed their own opinion about Mashrab's life and creative activity. More detailed information we find in “Qissai Mashrab” by Pirmat Setoriy. This work has many manuscripts and copies.

Sobir Rahmonov (1910–1990) — a famous theater actor, People's Artist of Uzbekistan (1961)

Usmon Nosir (1912–1944)- The talented poet Usmon Nosir who entered the Uzbek literature of the 20th century as a thunder and lived a very short creative life as a lightning. He was born on November 13, 1912, in Namangan. Writing books from his childhood his creative work extended only 15 years, until the time he was put in prison. In that period he showed his rare talent. Young poet's books as “Quyosh bilan suhbat” (conversation with the sun) (1932), “Safarbar satrlar” (mobilized lines) (1932), “Yurak” (heart) (1935), “Mehrim” (my loving) (1935) were published at that time. In 1937, on July 14, with the slander "the enemy of the people" he was put in prison first in Tashkent, Magadan and in Kemerovo. Being exhausted in the prison he died in 1944, in Kemerovo.

Yoqub Ahmedov (born 1938) — a notable theater and film actor, People's Artist of the USSR (1991)
Obidkhon Sobitkhony (born 1958), Uzbek imam regime critic

Sister cities 
 Seongnam, South Korea (September 22, 2009)
 Shanghai, China (June 2, 2011)
 Prague, Czech Republic (March 17, 2012)

References

External links 

 The official website of the Namangan City Administration 
 Information about the city of Namangan on the official website of the Namangan Region Administration 

 
Cities in Uzbekistan
Populated places along the Silk Road
Populated places in Namangan Region
Fergana Oblast